Henryk Vogelfänger (4 October 1904 – 6 October 1990), stage name Tońko, was a Polish actor. He lived in prewar Lwów (now Lviv, Ukraine) where he worked as a lawyer. Together with Kazimierz Wajda he was the star of the Polish Radio comedy duo Szczepko and Tońko of Wesoła Lwowska Fala, which was popular in Poland.

Biography
He was a graduate of the Stanisław Staszic's 6th Junion High School in Lwow. After graduating from the University, in 1935 he opened his own law office. In 1933, together with Kazimierz Wajda ("Szczepko"), he began his comedy career in Wesoła Lwowska Fala.

During World War II he was a part of French actors troupe, performing in England and on the Western front. He was a soldier in General Maczek's First Division. After the war, he went into exile in Great Britain, where he adopted the name "Henry Barker" and practiced law. He returned to Poland in 1988. He died on October 6, 1990 and was buried in London.

Filmography

See also
Batiar

References

External links
 

1990 deaths
1904 births
Polish male voice actors
Polish male film actors
University of Lviv alumni
Recipients of the Silver Cross of Merit (Poland)
Polish emigrants to the United Kingdom
Polish people of German descent
20th-century Polish male actors
20th-century Polish lawyers